Tatiana Weiss (born 26 February 1985) is a Russian weightlifter.

Matveeva participated in the women's -69 kg class at the 2006 World Weightlifting Championships and won the silver medal, finishing behind Oxana Slivenko. She snatched 110 kg and clean and jerked an additional 135 kg for a total of 245 kg, 18 kg behind winner Slivenko.

At the 2008 European Weightlifting Championships she won the silver medal in the 69 kg category.

References

Living people
1985 births
World Weightlifting Championships medalists
Russian female weightlifters
Place of birth missing (living people)
Female powerlifters
European Weightlifting Championships medalists